The Battle of the Strait of Messina was fought in 276 BC when a Carthaginian fleet attacked the Sicilian fleet of Pyrrhus of Epirus, who was crossing the strait to Italy. Pyrrhus had left Italy for Sicily on the Autumn of 278 BC and scored several major victories against the Carthaginian armies, but Roman successes against Pyrrhus' Italian allies convinced him to return to Italy.

While Pyrrhus was transporting his troops to Rhegium his fleet of 110 decked warships and hundreds of transports was attacked by the Carthaginians. The Carthaginian navy sank 70 of the Greek ships and damaged 28. Pyrrhus' surviving ships, amounting to 12 warships plus the transport ships, docked at Locri where he had left his son Alexander when he opened his Sicilian campaign.

Sources

References

Strait of Messina
Strait of Messina
276 BC
Straits of Messina
Strait of Messina
Strait of Messina
Strait of Messina